Mahmudabad (also Romanized as Maḩmūdābād) is a village in Mashiz Rural District, in the Central District of Bardsir County, Kerman Province, Iran. At the 2006 census, its population was 146, in 38 families.

References 

Populated places in Bardsir County